The 2011 Boston Pizza Cup was held February 9–13 at the High River Arena in High River, Alberta.  The winning team of Kevin Martin represented Alberta at the 2011 Tim Hortons Brier in London, Ontario.

Teams

(*Skips and throws third stones)

Draw Brackets

A Event

B Event

C Event

Results
 All times local (Mountain Standard Time)

Draw 1
February 9, 9:30am

Draw 2
February 9, 6:30pm

Draw 3
February 10, 9:00am

Draw 4
February 10, 2:00pm

Draw 5
February 10, 6:30pm

A Final
February 10, 6:30pm

Draw 6
February 11, 9:00am

Draw 7
February 11, 2:00pm

Draw 8
February 11, 6:30pm

B Final
February 11, 6:30pm

C Final 1
February 12, 1:00pm

C Final 2
February 12, 1:00pm

Playoffs

C1 vs. C2
February 12, 6:30pm

A vs. B
February 12, 6:30pm

Semi-final
February 13, 9:30am

Final
February 13, 2:00pm

References

External links
Official event site

Boston Pizza Cup, 2011
Curling in Alberta
High River
2011 in Alberta
February 2011 sports events in Canada